Eleanor Jane Taylor (born 28 November 1983) is an English comedian, television personality, actress, and writer. After appearing on Show Me the Funny in 2011, Taylor has appeared on numerous television shows, including 8 Out of 10 Cats (2011–2017), Fake Reaction (2013–2014), Mock the Week (2015–2019), The Lodge (2016), Stand-Up Central (2017), The Mash Report (2017–2022), Plebs (2018–2019), and Strictly Come Dancing (2022). She has also presented the shows Snog Marry Avoid? (2012–2013) and Live at the Apollo (2016–2018).

Taylor has written and performed five stand-up comedy shows: Elliementary (2015), Infidelliety (2016), This Guy (2017–2018), Cravings (2019)  also shown on Netflix as part of Comedians of the World  and Don't Got This (2019–2021). In 2021, she published her debut book, My Child and Other Mistakes, which became a Sunday Times bestseller.

Early life 
Taylor was born in Brentwood, Essex. She studied English literature at the University of York. Taylor was a member of University of York Drama Society and "did three or four plays".

Career 
She was spotted by a model agency scout while interning for FHM magazine, and signed with ISIS Models She did campaigns for Matalan, Asda and Pantene. Taylor decided she would rather not be a model, so she began working on corporate events. In her mid-twenties,  Taylor began doing stand-up comedy.

"When I was younger it was people like Victoria Wood who I loved"— Ellie Taylor

Taylor was discovered on ITV series Show Me the Funny, an X Factor-style contest for aspiring stand-up comedians. In 2014, she performed her debut show Elliementary at the Laughing Horse as part of the Edinburgh free fringe programme.

In June 2015, she made her debut in the 14th series of BBC Two's Mock the Week, and appeared in every series until the 18th.

In March 2016, Taylor appeared in the third series of CBBC's panel show The Dog Ate My Homework. She appeared a second time later that month.

In September 2016, Taylor had a recurring role in The Lodge as Christina. Taylor also plays Gloria, the next-door business-owner to the main characters in ITV2 Ancient Roman comedy series Plebs.

In 2017, Taylor became a regular fill-in for Emma Bunton on London's Heart Radio breakfast show.

Since July 2017, she has been a regular on BBC2 satirical comedy sketch series The Mash Report, appearing as Susan, a newsreader. A clip of her performance later went viral, after it was posted across social media by musician Madonna.

In 2018, Taylor appeared in an advert for Stowford Press cider.

On 5 July 2018, it was announced Taylor and Anna Whitehouse would host a new talk show on radio station Heart FM on Sunday nights from 10pm to 1am. The show later became available as a podcast, Ellie and Anna Have Issues.

Taylor has been a regular on the BBC TV stand-up-comedy programme Live at the Apollo, both as a featured act and as a host.

In 2019, her half-hour stand-up special Cravings was released on Netflix as part of Comedians of the World.

Taylor has also been a guest on 8 Out of 10 Cats, Pointless Celebrities, Insert Name Here, QI, The Last Leg, Big Brother's Bit on the Side, and Show Me the Funny. In 2011, she won Company magazine's Lady HaHa title. In 2012, she replaced Jenny Frost as the presenter of Snog Marry Avoid? on BBC Three. She was one of the team leaders on the comedy panel show Fake Reaction. In 2013, she appeared in an episode of the HBO mockumentary series Family Tree.

In 2019, she again became a fill-in presenter on Heart, this time for Amanda Holden, on the national breakfast show alongside regular host Jamie Theakston.

In December 2019, it was announced that Taylor would step down from her Heart FM show to focus on her TV commitments. However, her podcast with Anna Whitehouse, Ellie & Anna Have Issues, is still released every Tuesday.

In July 2021, Taylor published her debut book My Child and Other Mistakes: How to ruin your life in the best way possible, which became a Sunday Times bestseller.

In August 2022, she was revealed as a contestant on the twentieth series of Strictly Come Dancing. Taylor and her professional dance partner Johannes Radebe were eliminated in Week 10 after losing the dance off to Fleur East and Vito Coppola.

Personal life 
Taylor married reporter Phil Black in London in 2014 and has one daughter.

Filmography

Tours 
 Elliementary (2015)
 Infidelliety (2016)
 This Guy (2017–2018)
 Cravings (2019)
 Don't Got This (2019–2021)

Bibliography 

 My Child and Other Mistakes: How to Ruin Your Life in the Best Way Possible (2021)

References

External links 
 
 
 

21st-century English comedians
Alumni of the University of York
English television presenters
English women comedians
Living people
People from Brentwood, Essex
People from Basildon
Year of birth missing (living people)